The FIBA Oceania Championship for Women 1997 was the qualifying tournament of FIBA Oceania for the 1998 FIBA World Championship for Women, and the 2000 Summer Olympics. The basketball tournament was held in Wellington and Palmerston North. Australia won the tournament to qualify for the World Championship and New Zealand qualified for the Olympics.

Results

Championship

Final standings

References
FIBA Archive

1997 in basketball
basket
FIBA Oceania Championship for Women
International basketball competitions hosted by New Zealand